Crown Prince of the Republic is a 1934 Soviet comedy film directed by Eduard Ioganson.

Plot 
The film tells about a couple who live easily and carefree. The wife becomes pregnant and gladly talks about it to her husband, but it upsets him and their life completely changes.

Cast 
 Pyotr Kirillov as The Husband
 Yevgeniya Pyryalova as The Wife
 Andrei Apsolon as Andrei, an architect
 Georgiy Zhzhonov as Bachelor-architect
 Georgi Orlov as Bachelor-architect
 Sergei Ponachevny as Bachelor-architect
 Nikolai Urvantsev as The old man
 K. Yegorov as The baby
 Nikolay Cherkasov as Waitor
 Yuri Muzykant as Passenger in the tram
 Mikhail Rostovtsev as Professor

References

External links 

1934 films
1930s Russian-language films
Soviet black-and-white films
Soviet comedy films
1934 comedy films